Salvo is a census-designated place located in Dare County, North Carolina, United States, on Hatteras Island, part of North Carolina's Outer Banks. As of the 2010 census, Salvo had a population of 229. Originally (with Rodanthe and Waves) part of the settlement of Chicamacomico, Salvo was originally known as "Clarks" or "Clarksville."

The name "Salvo" allegedly stems from the American Civil War, during which a passing Union vessel spotted the settlement, which was not marked on their maps. The commanding officer ordered an attack, and a sailor marked the site on his map with the word "Salvo." The name was formally given to the town when it received a post office in 1901. The Salvo post office, ZIP code 27972, one of the smallest postal facilities in the United States, was damaged by an arsonist in 1992. A new post office was constructed later in the decade for all of Chicamacomico. Hurricane Irene in August 2011 damaged much of the Outer Banks area including Salvo.

The residents of Salvo are governed by the Dare County Board of Commissioners. Salvo is part of District 4, along with Avon, Buxton, Frisco, Hatteras, Rodanthe and Waves.

On June 24, 2014, a Virginia vacationer became buried alive in beach sand when trying to dig a tunnel, and then died.

Salvo Post Office was listed on the National Register of Historic Places in 1993.

Demographics

2020 census

As of the 2020 United States census, there were 303 people, 43 households, and 35 families residing in the CDP.

Climate

According to the Trewartha climate classification system, Salvo, North Carolina has a humid subtropical climate with hot and humid summers, cool winters and year-around precipitation (Cfak). Cfak climates are characterized by all months having an average mean temperature > 32.0 °F (> 0.0 °C), at least eight months with an average mean temperature ≥ 50.0 °F (≥ 10.0 °C), at least one month with an average mean temperature ≥ 71.6 °F (≥ 22.0 °C) and no significant precipitation difference between seasons. During the summer months in Salvo, a cooling afternoon sea breeze is present on most days, but episodes of extreme heat and humidity can occur with heat index values ≥ 100 °F (≥ 38 °C). Salvo is prone to hurricane strikes, particularly during the Atlantic hurricane season which extends from June 1 through November 30, sharply peaking from late August through September. During the winter months, episodes of cold and wind can occur with wind chill values < 10 °F (< -12 °C). The plant hardiness zone in Salvo is 8b with an average annual extreme minimum air temperature of 17.2 °F (-8.2 °C). The average seasonal (Dec-Mar) snowfall total is < 2 inches (< 5 cm), and the average annual peak in nor'easter activity is in February.

Ecology

According to the A. W. Kuchler U.S. potential natural vegetation types, Salvo, North Carolina would have a dominant vegetation type of Live oak/Sea Oats Uniola paniculata (90) with a dominant vegetation form of Coastal Prairie (20).

Education
Residents are zoned to Dare County Schools. Zoned schools are Cape Hatteras Elementary School and Cape Hatteras Secondary School.

References

External links
 Salvo Volunteer Fire Department

Census-designated places in Dare County, North Carolina
Census-designated places in North Carolina
Beaches of North Carolina
Hatteras Island
Populated places established in 1901
Beaches of Dare County, North Carolina
Populated coastal places in North Carolina